J18 may refer to:

Vehicles

Locomotives 
 GSR Class J18, an Irish steam locomotive
 LNER Class J18, a British steam locomotive class

Ships 
 , a Hunt-class minesweeper of the Royal Navy
 , a Halland-class destroyer of the Swedish Navy
 , a Sandhayak-class survey ship of the Indian Navy

Other uses 
 Carnival Against Capital, an anti-globalisation protest held on June 18th 1999
 County Route J18 (California)
 Elongated triangular cupola, a Johnson solid (J18)
 J18 Elit, the highest level of under-18 ice hockey in Sweden
 Pneumonia

See also
 18-j, 2004 film